WOFM is a non-commercial, non-profit Christian radio station broadcasting on 89.1 MHz in the Knoxville, Tennessee area.

WYLV began in February 1993 broadcasting on 89.1 FM with programming from the Morning Star network. In September 1999, the station changed to a local format with onsite staff and DJs.

On January 1, 2011, WOEZ became an affiliate of the Air 1 network after being sold to Educational Media Foundation. Later in January, the WYLV call letters were moved to the 88.3 frequency, as an affiliate of the K-LOVE network. At that time, Air 1 moved to WOFM, which had been WYLV.

External links

Air1 radio stations
Alcoa, Tennessee
Radio stations established in 1993
1993 establishments in Tennessee
Educational Media Foundation radio stations
OFM